Viča is a Serbian place name. It may refer to:

 Viča, Lučani, Serbia
 Viča, Prokuplje, Serbia
 Viča, Štrpce, Kosovo

See also
Vića, Bosnia and Herzegovina

Serbo-Croatian place names